Isoa Nasilasila (born 13 September 1999) is a Fijian rugby union player, currently playing for the . His preferred position is lock.

Professional career
Nasilasila was named in the Fijian Drua squad for the 2022 Super Rugby Pacific season.

References

External links
 

1999 births
Living people
Fijian rugby union players
Rugby union locks
Fijian Drua players
Fiji international rugby union players
North Harbour rugby union players